UEC may refer to: 
Urban Entertainment Center
Union Election Commission, the electoral commission of Myanmar (Burma)
Unified Examinations Certificate, an examination held by the United School Committees' Association Malaysia for Chinese independent high school students
Universal electronic card, an identity card formerly issued to citizens of Russia to use instead of an internal passport
University of Electro-Communications, a Japanese university based in Chofu city, Tokyo
University of Exeter, Cornwall Campus, campus of the University of Exeter at Tremough, in Penryn, Cornwall, United Kingdom
Union Européenne de Cyclisme (European Cycling Union)
United Electric Car Company, a defunct tramcar manufacturer in the United Kingdom
United Engine Corporation, a Russian aircraft engine manufacturer
Ubuntu Enterprise Cloud, open-source infrastructure for cloud computing under Ubuntu Linux 
Urea, electrolytes, creatinine, a blood test sometimes referred to as a basic metabolic panel
UEC Cup, computer Go tournament held at the University of Electro-Communications
Uganda Electoral Commission, the electoral commission of Uganda